The ʻUrabi revolt, also known as the ʻUrabi Revolution, was a nationalist uprising in Egypt from 1879 to 1882. It was led by and named for Colonel Ahmed ʻUrabi or Orabi and sought to depose the Khedive Tewfik Pasha and end British and French influence over the country. The uprising was ended by an Anglo-Egyptian War and takeover of the country. It thus began the History of Egypt under the British.

Prologue
Egypt in the 1870s was under foreign influence, corruption, misgovernment, and in a state of financial ruin. Huge debts rung up by its ruler Ismaʻil Pasha could no longer be repaid and under pressure from the European banks that held the debt, the country's finances were being controlled by representatives of France and Britain.  When Ismaʻil tried to rouse the Egyptian people against this foreign intervention, he was deposed by the British and replaced by his more pliable son Tewfik Pasha.

The upper ranks of the civil service, the army, and the business world had become dominated by Europeans, who were paid more than native Egyptians. Within Egypt, a parallel legal system for suing Europeans separately from the natives was set up. This angered educated and ambitious Egyptians in the military and civil service who felt that the European domination of top positions was preventing their own advancement. The heavily taxed Egyptian peasants, were also annoyed by their taxes going to Europeans who lived in relative wealth.

Egyptians resented not only West European domination, but also the Turks, Circassians and Albanians in Egypt who controlled most other elite positions in the government and military.  Albanian troops had come to Egypt along with Muhammad Ali, and helped him to take control of the country, and they were highly favored by the Khedive.  Turkish was still the official language of the army, and Turks were more likely to be promoted.  In the ruling cabinet under Khedive Tawfiq, every member was a Turco-Circassian.  The growing fiscal crisis in the country forced the Khedive to drastically cut the army.  From a height of 94,000 troops in 1874, the army was cut to 36,000 in 1879, with plans to shrink it even more.  This created a large class of unemployed and disaffected army officers within the country.  The disastrous Ethiopian–Egyptian War in 1875-1876 also angered the officers, who felt that the government had sent them unwisely into the conflict.

A public consciousness was developing in Egypt during this period, literacy was spreading, more newspapers were being published in the 1870s and 1880s such as the influential paper Abu Naddara Zarqa. Published by Yaqub Sanu, a Jew of Italian and Egyptian origins, this Paris-based publication was a political satire magazine which often mocked the establishment under European control, and the publication increasingly irritated the ruling powers as well as the Europeans as it favored reform and revolutionary movements. This paper had a wide reach, unlike many other publications, Abu Naddara Zarqa was written in Egyptian Arabic rather than classical Arabic, making its satire and political pieces understandable to the masses, not just the educated elite.  Ya'qub Sanu' claimed that his magazine reached a circulation of 10,000, which was a huge number in those days.

During this time Ahmad ʻUrabi, a native non-European army officer had risen up through the army to the rank of Colonel. Because of his peasant upbringing and traditional training, he came to be viewed by many as the authentic voice of people of Egypt. To them, he represented a peasant population frustrated with tax-exempt foreigners and wealthy local landlords. ʻUrabi commanded the respect and support of not only the peasantry, but also a large portion of the Egyptian army as well.

ʻUrabi's seizure of power
Tension built over the summer of 1881 as both the Khedive and the Egyptian officers, now led by ʻUrabi, searched for supporters and gathered allies. In September the Khedive ordered ʻUrabi's regiment to leave Cairo. ʻUrabi refused and ordered the dismissal of the Turco-Circassian generals and the creation of an elected government. Unable to oppose the revolt, Tewfiq agreed and a new chamber of deputies and government were established containing a number of ʻUrabi's allies. In January 1882, ʻUrabi became Minister of War.

Foreign intervention
On January 8, 1882, the French and British sent a joint note that asserted the primacy of the Khedive's authority.  The note infuriated the parliamentarians and ʻUrabi.  The government collapsed and a new one with ʻUrabi as Minister of War was created. This new government threatened the positions of Europeans in the government and also began laying-off large numbers of Turco-Circassian officers.

This broad effort at reform was opposed by the European interests, and many of the large landowners, the Turkish and Circassian elite, the high-ranking ulama (Muslim clergy), Syrian Christians, and most of the wealthiest members of society.  In contrast, it had the support of most of the rest of the Egyptian population including lower-level ulama, the officer corps, and local leaders.

Copts were divided: their close affiliation with Europeans angered many and sometime made them a target, but the deep rivalry between Coptic and Syrian Christians led many to align with other Egyptian rebels. The Coptic Patriarch lent his support to the revolt when it was at its peak, but later claimed that he was pressured into doing so. ʻUrabi and other leaders of the revolt acknowledged the Copts as potential allies and worked to prevent any targeting of the minority by nationalist Muslims, but were not always successful.

An effort to court the Ottoman Sultan Abdul Hamid II began. Tewfik Pasha called on the sultan to quell the revolt, but the Sublime Porte hesitated to employ troops against Muslims who were opposing foreign colonial rule.  ʻUrabi asked the Sultan to depose Tewfiq, but again the Sultan hesitated.

British invasion

On the afternoon of June 11, 1882 the political turmoil exploded into violence on the streets of Alexandria.  Rioters attacked Greek, Maltese and Italian businesses and battles broke out in the streets. About fifty Europeans and 250 Egyptians were killed. The exact cause of the revolt is uncertain; both the Khedive and ʻUrabi have been blamed for starting it, but there is no proof of either allegation.

As the city's garrison was maintaining the coastal defence batteries, an ultimatum was sent demanding the batteries be dismantled under threat of bombardment. The ultimatum was ignored, and the British fleet off Alexandria under Admiral Beauchamp Seymour, 1st Baron Alcester bombarded the city. The coastal batteries returned fire. The French fleet, also at Alexandria, refused to participate. A large British naval force then tried to capture the city. Despite encountering heavy resistance, the British forces succeeded, forcing the Egyptians to withdraw.

As revolts spread across Egypt, the British House of Commons voted in favour of a larger intervention. The British army launched a probing/scouting attack at Battle of Kafr El Dawwar to determine whether or not Cairo could be advanced on from Alexandria, However the British concluded that the Egyptian defences were too strong, so in September of that year a British army was landed in the Canal Zone. The motivation for the British intervention is still disputed. The British were especially concerned that ʻUrabi would default on Egypt's massive debt and that he might try to gain control of the Suez Canal. On September 13, 1882, the British forces defeated ʻUrabi's army at the Battle of Tell El Kebir. ʻUrabi was captured and eventually exiled to the British colony of Ceylon (now Sri Lanka).

Aftermath
While the British intervention was meant to be short term, it in fact persisted until 1954. Egypt was effectively made a colony until 1952.  Both the British and the Khedival government did their best to discredit ʻUrabi's name and the revolution, although among the common people ʻUrabi remained a popular figure. The government used the state media and educational system to denounce ʻUrabi as a traitor and the revolution as merely a military mutiny. Egyptian historian Mohammed Rif'at was one of the first to call the events a thawrah, or "revolution," but he claimed that it lacked popular support. Other historians in Egypt supported this thesis, and even expanded on it, sometimes suffering government censure. During the last years of the monarchy, authors became more critical of the old establishment and especially of the British, and ʻUrabi is sometimes portrayed as a hero of freedom and constitutionalism

ʻUrabi's Revolt had a long lasting significance as the first instance of Egyptian anti-colonial nationalism, which would later play a very major role in Egyptian history. Especially under Gamal Abdel Nasser, the revolt would be regarded as a "glorious struggle" against foreign occupation. The ʻUrabi Revolution was seen by the Free Officers movement as a precursor to the 1952 revolution, and both Nasser and Muhammad Neguib were likened to ʻUrabi. Nasserist textbooks called the ʻUrabi Revolt a "national revolution," but ʻUrabi was seen as making great strategic mistakes and not being as much of a man of the people as Nasser. During Nasser's experiment with Arab socialism, the ʻUrabi revolt was also sometimes put in a Marxist context. Also during President Sadat's infitah (economic liberalisation) period in which there was growing, controlled, economic liberalization and growing ties with the Western bloc, the government played up the desire of the ʻUrabists to draft a constitution and have democratic elections. After the 1952 revolution, the image of ʻUrabi, at least officially, has generally improved, with a number of streets and a square in Cairo bearing his name indicating the honored position he has in the official history.

Views of historians
Historians have in general been divided, with one group seeing the revolt as a push for liberalism and freedom on the model of the French Revolution and others arguing that it was little more than a military coup, similar to those made about the 1952 movement. Among Western historians, especially British, there was a traditional view that the ʻUrabi revolution was nothing more than a "revolt" or "insurrection" and not a real social revolution. By far the most influential Englishman in Egypt, Lord Cromer, wrote a scathing assessment of the ʻUrabists in his Modern Egypt.  While this view is still held by many, there has been a growing trend to call the ʻUrabi revolution a real revolution, especially amongst newer historians who tend to emphasize social and economic history and to examine native, rather than European, sources.

The earliest published work of Augusta, Lady Gregory—later to embrace Irish nationalism and have an important role in the cultural life of Ireland—was Arabi and His Household (1882), a pamphlet (originally a letter to The Times newspaper) in support of Ahmed ʻUrabi and his revolt. Juan Cole, a Professor at the University of Michigan in Ann Arbor has recently published an appraisal of the ʻUrabi revolt.

Historians have also been divided over the reasons for the British invasion, with some arguing that it was to protect the Suez Canal and prevent "anarchy", while others argue that it was to protect the interests of British investors with assets in Egypt (see Anglo-Egyptian War).

See also
 Battle of Tell El Kebir

References

Further reading
 Abu-Lughod, Ibrahim. "The Transformation of the Egyptian Élite: Prelude to the 'Urābī Revolt." Middle East Journal (1967): 325–344.
 Cole, Juan. Colonialism and Revolution in the Middle East: Social and Cultural Origins of Egypt's ʻUrabi Movement (Princeton University Press, 1993)
 Huffaker, Shauna. "Representations of Ahmed Urabi: Hegemony, Imperialism, and the British Press, 1881–1882." Victorian Periodicals Review 45.4 (2012): 375-405 online.
 Mayer, Thomas. The Changing Past: Egyptian Historiography of the Urabi Revolt, 1882-1982 (University Presses of Florida, 1988).
 Ozan, A. Ş. I. K. "On Philip Abrams and a Multi-Faceted 'Historical Event': The Urabi Movement (1879-1882) in Egypt." Mavi Atlas 6.1: 170–184. online
 Reid, Donald Malcolm. . "The Urabi revolution and the British conquest, 1879-1882." in M. W. Daly, ed. The Cambridge History of Egypt (Volume 2) (1999) pp 217–238.

 
1879 in Egypt
1880 in Egypt
1881 in Egypt
1882 in Egypt
Conflicts in 1879
Conflicts in 1880
Conflicts in 1881
Conflicts in 1882
19th-century rebellions
Rebellions in Egypt
Revolutions in Egypt
African resistance to colonialism
Resistance to the British Empire